Big Brother 1 was the first season of the Bulgarian version of Big Brother and it's the first reality show in Bulgaria. The show was aired on Nova Television. The show started on 18 October 2004 and ended on 17 January 2005 and it was hosted by Niki Kanchev and Evelina Pavlova. The winner was Zdravko, who won 200 000 leva. He also participated in the second season of VIP Brother - the season was won by his wife.

Housemates
12 Housemates entered the House on Day 1, and another 1 on Day 18. Veneta and Zeyneb entered on Day 50.

Alidzhan 
Alidzhan Aliev is from Sofia. He entered the house on Day 1 and was the eighth evicted on Day 85.

Anelia 
Anelia Ivanova is from Sofia (born in Ruse). She entered the house on Day 1 and was the first evicted on Day 22. Disappointed with her participation, Anelia returned to Italy, where she lived before the show.

Dimitar 
Dimitar Kazalov is from Sofia (lives in London). He entered the house on Day 1 and left voluntarily on Day 17.

Margarita 
Margarita Grigorova is from Kyustendil. She entered the house on Day 1 and was the third evicted on Day 36.

Mariela 
Mariela Kiselkova "Mel" is from Sofia (born in Veliko Tarnovo). She entered the house on Day 1 and was the fifth evicted on Day 57. She had a brief lesbian romance with her roommate Svetlozara and made love to her.

Nayden 
Nayden Naydenov is from Sofia. He entered the house on Day 1, but was ejected on Day 48 along with Svetlan for aggressive behavior. After an incident in which they both started vandalism (breaking things in the house), the nominations were cancelled and there were open special telephone lines - the viewers had to decide whether they should be punished. They had four choices - to eject Nayden, to eject Svetlan, to eject both of them, or both of them simply to stay in the house. Nayden celebrated his 25th birthday in the house - there was a party in which Zara came out of a big cake. They had sex the same night.

Silvia-Aleksandra 
Silvia-Aleksandra Docheva is from Lovech. She entered the house on Day 1 and was the second evicted on Day 29.

Stoyka 
Stoyka Stefanova is from Plovdiv. She entered the house on Day 1 and was the fourth evicted on Day 43.

Svetlan 
Svetlan Shevrov "Groshi" is from Kostandovo. He entered the house on Day 1, but was ejected along with Nayden on Day 48.

Svetlozara  
Svetlozara Trendafilova "Zara" is from Varna. She entered the house on Day 1 and finished second in the finale on Day 92. She had a brief lesbian romance and sexual encounter with her roommate Mariela.

Tihomir 
Tihomir Georgiev is from Sofia. He entered the house on Day 18, after Dimitar's voluntary leave. He was the sixth evicted on Day 71. After he left the house, he met and later married the famous TV host Veneta Raykova. On 26 March 2007 they both entered the house as participants in VIP Brother 2.

Veneta 
Veneta Mileva-Ilieva is from Kostinbrod. She entered the house on Day 50, along with Zeyneb. Veneta left the house voluntarily on Day 58. After her participation in the show, she gave birth to her third child.

Viktor 
Viktor Zhechkov is from Sliven. He entered the house on Day 1 and finished third in the finale on Day 92. Viktor was the only housemate not to be nominated for eviction (never faced the public vote) during the whole season.

Zdravko 
Zdravko Vasilev is from Primorsko. He entered the house on Day 1 and became a winner on Day 92. An interesting fact is that his girlfriend Hristina contacted him during his stay in the house to tell him she was pregnant. On 26 March 2007 Zdravko entered the house again, this time as a participant in VIP Brother 2. Before entering, he proposed marriage to Hristina. On Day 5, she entered the house, too with their daughter. The couple married in the house. Surprisingly, Hristina was the winner of VIP Brother 2.

Zeyneb 
Zeyneb Madzhurova is from Burgas. She entered the house on Day 50 along with Veneta, after Nayden and Svetlan's ejections. She was the seventh evicted on Day 78.

Weekly summary and highlights

Nominations table

Notes

 : Initially, Dimitar and Anelia faced the public vote. However, after Dimitar walked, his nominations were voided meaning Mariela, Silvia-Aleksandra and Stoyka would also face the public vote with Anelia.
 : As a new Housemate, Tihomir was exempt from the nominations process this week.
 : Week 7's eviction was cancelled after the public voted to allow Big Brother to eject both Nayden & Svetlan as punishment for aggressive behavior and vandalizing the house.
 : As new Housemates, Veneta and Zeyneb were exempt from the nominations process this week.
 : As Veneta walked prior to nominations, nominations and the planned eviction for Week 9 were cancelled.
 : For the final week, the public were voting for a winner.

References

External links 
 The official website of Big Brother 1

2004 Bulgarian television seasons
2005 Bulgarian television seasons
 1
2005 Bulgarian television series endings